Jobo Khatoane (born June 8, 1991) is a professional Mosotho long-distance runner.  He was selected to compete in the marathon at the 2012 London Olympics but had to withdraw before the race due to a pelvis injury.

He was scheduled to compete in the men's half marathon at the 2019 African Games but he did not start.

References

External links
IAAF profile

Lesotho male long-distance runners
Lesotho male marathon runners
Living people
1991 births
Lesotho male cross country runners